The Center for the Study of Democracy is a research and education institute at St. Mary's College of Maryland that focuses on the study of the history of emerging democracy in St. Mary's City, Maryland, the site of the state's first colonial capital and the location of many firsts in the development of democratic rights in North America; this work is done in conjunction with studies of modern democracies.

The mission of the Center for the Study of Democracy is to draw historical lessons and also inspiration from history, in order to increase understanding of the processes and principles that lead to the constructive maintenance and enhancement of democracy in the United States and around the world.

It does so by drawing on in-depth historical research, in conjunction with in-depth research on modern democracy-related issues and events, as they both relate to the process of democratization (establishing and improving democracy in all of its processes).

The center also sponsors numerous ongoing public forums and debates and seminars on these issues, many of which are covered by the media.

The debates also often include hosting and moderating major political leaders or policy leaders facing off against their opponents.

The Center for the Study of Democracy also strives to better understand historic setbacks and inconsistencies in the democratization process of historic Maryland and the United States, in order to better understand how these were eventually overcome; taking lessons from history that can then be applied to study of how democracy might be more constructively furthered today. The center Works in particular to increase understanding of how democracy may be enhanced in spite of the many obstacles that democratization often faces.

The center is jointly run by the Public Honors College, St. Mary's College of Maryland and its partner institution and neighbor, Historic St. Mary's City, one of the nation's preeminent historical and archeological research institutions.

History

The Center for the Study of Democracy was established in 2002. Such notable people as former U.S. District Court judge Thomas Penfield Jackson, former National Security Adviser Anthony Lake former state Senator J. Frank Raley Jr. and former Maryland Governor William Donald Schaefer were very involved in its founding as well as being advisory board members.

So was former Washington Post Editor in Chief Benjamin C. Bradlee.

All of these men also served for years on the Board of Trustees of St. Mary's College of Maryland.

Events

The Center for the Study of Democracy hosts over 25 educational events and/or public forums per year.

Political forums

The center hosts forums for state and national politicians on various key issues related to democratic governance, human rights, inclusion, lawmaking and security as it relates to democracy.

Lectures and seminars

The center sponsors and also directly provides many academic and also public lectures on both the historical and modern process of democratization. Learning from history (both recent history and older, foundational history) in order to better understand how democracy takes hold, and may be enhanced and spread constructively and effectively.

College educational programs

The center provides a minor in Democracy Studies at the St. Mary's College of Maryland. It also hosts numerous seminars and forums available to students.

It also provides special visiting lecturers and scholars, as well as providing special lectures to other college classes and programs.

Patuxent Defense Forum

The center also hosts the Patuxent Defense Forum, a gathering of high level experts on international security, including representatives from the academic community, foreign policy leadership, defense industry and military leadership. The purpose of the forum is to increase understanding related to the processes that lead to constructive maintenance and enhancement of democracy from a strategic defense point of view.

Public Lectures

The center also sponsors and hosts public lectures on areas of study related to its mission:

 Peter S. Carmichael, Civil War Expert, Lecture on Slavery and the Civil War in the South

Research

Historical research

The center supports and engages in research focused on examining the birth and emergence of various aspects of democracy in the earlier history of the state of Maryland and also the wider English speaking world. It then applies lessons and perspectives related to this history to modern day issues tied to the furtherance of democracy, both in the United States and in newly emerging democracies around the world.

Contemporary research

Extensive research is also done on issues related to the emergence of democracy in countries where it never previously existed or persisted; enhancement and furtherance of democracy in developed nations as well as furtherance of minority and women's participation in democracy worldwide.

National Public Radio

On Maryland and Washington, D.C. public radio, the Center for the Study of Democracy is often sought out for expert commentary.

Funding

The Institution is both publicly and privately funded. It is nonprofit and under the joint operation of the Public Honors College, St. Mary's College of Maryland (a Maryland state public school) and Historic St. Mary's City Maryland (a state research, historic interpretation and educational agency).

The organization has been funded by the National Endowment for the Humanities. It also has a history of gaining funding from other major granting institutions.

Directorship

The current director of the center is Dr. Michael J.G. Cain, a professor of Political Science at St. Mary's College of Maryland.

The prior director was Todd Eberly, also a professor at St. Mary's College of Maryland as well as being a noted Maryland political commentator. Eberly is often heard on several radio shows and is often quoted by the Washington Post, as well as writing his own columns.

Notable advisory board members

Jon Armajani 	Associate Professor, Department of Theology, College of St. Benedict and St. John's University
Jennifer Cognard-Black 	Professor of English, St. Mary's College of Maryland
Benjamin Bradlee 	Vice President-at-Large of The Washington Post, former President of Historic St. Mary's City Commission, and College Trustee
Benjamin L. Cardin 	U.S. Senator and former College Trustee
John P. Casciano 	President and Chief Executive Officer, GrayStar Associates, LLC
Rosann Catalano 	Roman Catholic theologian at the Institute for Christian and Jewish Studies
Kenneth Cohen 	Assistant Professor of History, St. Mary's College of Maryland
Helen Ginn Daugherty 	Professor of Sociology, St. Mary's College of Maryland
Alan Dillingham 	Professor of Economics, St. Mary's College of Maryland
Joseph W. Dyer 	Former Chief Strategy Officer, iRobot
Todd Eberly 	Assistant Professor of Political Science and former Acting Director of the Center for the Study of Democracy
Regina Faden 	Executive Director, Historic St. Mary's City
Bonnie Green 	Executive Director, The Patuxent Partnership and former College Trustee
Ronald Hoffman 	Executive Director, Omohundro Institute of Early American History and Culture at the College of William and Mary
Charles Holden 	Professor of History, St. Mary's College of Maryland Civil War expert
The Honorable Steny Hoyer 	U.S. Representative from Maryland, House Majority Leader, and College Trustee
Randolph K. Larsen 	Associate Professor of Chemistry, St. Mary's College of Maryland
Steve McMahon 	Co-founder and Partner of Purple Strategies, LLC
Zach Messitte 	 President, Ripon College and former Director of the Center for the Study of Democracy
Bruce Riedel 	Saban Center for Middle East Policy, Brookings Institution
Terry Meyerhoff Rubenstein 	Former Executive Vice President of the Joseph Meyerhoff Family Charitable Funds and former Trustee of St. Mary's College of Maryland
Sahar Shafqat 	Associate Professor of Political Science, St. Mary's College of Maryland
Michael Steele 	 Former Lieutenant Governor of Maryland
Martin E. Sullivan 	 Director, Smithsonian National Portrait Gallery; former Director of Historic St. Mary's City

See also

History of democracy
Democratization
Minority rights
Women's suffrage
Religious tolerance
History of Maryland
Province of Maryland (colonial Maryland)
History of slavery in Maryland
The American Civil War
American Civil Rights Movement
Democracy in the United States
History of the Middle East
History of South Africa
Democracy in India
Democracy in China
Democracy in Russia

External links
Center for the Study of Democracy official website
Some of the special programs sponsored by the Center for the Study of Democracy most are open to the public
Upcoming events sponsored by the Center for the Study of Democracy most are open to the public
Papers published by the center free online library run by the Center for the Study of Democracy. Some, but not all of the center's papers are available for online reading.

References

St. Mary's College of Maryland
St. Mary's City, Maryland
Democracy
Freedom of religion
African-American history of Maryland
Province of Maryland
Politics of Maryland
Politics of the United States
Democratization
2002 establishments in Maryland